Cesar Chavez Street  (formerly Army Street)  is an east–west street in San Francisco, California, United States. The street was renamed in 1995 in honor of American labor leader and Latino American civil rights activist, Cesar Chavez. It was widened in the middle of the 20th century to serve as a thoroughfare between the 101 and 280 freeways to the unbuilt Mission Freeway.

It starts at Pier 80 in the Bayview neighborhood and ends at Douglass Street in the Noe Valley. The intersection of Chavez and Mission is the heart of the micro-neighborhood locally known as "La Lengua."

The chase scene from the 1968 Steve McQueen film Bullitt started on what was then Army Street.

Background
Originally the street ran alongside the Precita Creek, parallel to Navy Street. Around 1900 the creek was channeled underground, and Army Street was paved over the former creek.

In the 1930s it was widened and meant to be a thoroughfare for automobiles. It is seen as the dividing line between the Mission District on the north, and Bernal Heights on the south. At one point it was a two-lane  street with its own streetcar line, but had been widened to six lanes by 1950.

It is considered an important east-west arterial, "... west of Third Street, [the street] is designated a major arterial and a Citywide Bicycle Route and carries 12,000 vehicles per day. It is a four-lane street that provides access to the west and connects to the central waterfront, India Basin, and Hunters Point Shipyard areas to the east. East of Third Street, it provides access to Pier 80."

The widening of Army Street was made as part of the development of the never constructed Southern Crossing from San Francisco to the East Bay.

The name of the street was changed to honor the city's Latino community, but the change was controversial at the time. Recognizing the negative effects created by the widening of the street, in 2011 the city started an effort to make the street more pedestrian friendly. The Cesar Chavez Streetscape Project implemented measures to "improve pedestrian and bicyclist safety, enhance greening, promote ecology function, and make the street work better ..."

See also
List of places named after Cesar Chavez

References

External links 

Streets in San Francisco